= Coen brothers bibliography =

A list of books and essays about the Coen brothers:

- Coen, Joel; Coen, Ethan; Allen, William Rodney (2006). The Coen Brothers: Interviews. Univ. Press of Mississippi. ISBN 978-1-57806-889-0.
- Conard, Mark T. (1 March 2009). The Philosophy of the Coen Brothers. University Press of Kentucky. ISBN 0-8131-3869-8.
- Levine, Josh (1 January 2000). The Coen Brothers: The Story of Two American Filmmakers. ECW Press. ISBN 978-1-55022-424-5.
- Luhr, William (2004). The Coen Brothers' Fargo. Cambridge University Press. ISBN 978-0-521-00501-2.
- Robson, Eddie (31 July 2011). Coen Brothers - Virgin Film. Ebury Publishing. ISBN 978-0-7535-4770-0.
